Father Mapple is a fictional character in Herman Melville's novel Moby-Dick (1851). A former whaler, he has become a preacher in the New Bedford Whaleman's Chapel. Ishmael, the narrator of the novel, hears Mapple's sermon on the subject of Jonah, who was swallowed by a whale but did not turn against God.

The sermon presents themes which concerned Melville and run through the rest of the novel. Father Mapple believes, as Captain Ahab does, that truth is clear to see, and that human beings must pursue it in spite of all obstacles. Ishmael, on the other hand, finds that truth has many forms and is difficult to see or understand.

Background

Models for the character
Enoch Mudge, a Methodist minister who was the chaplain of the New Bedford Seamen's Bethel, and Father E.T. Taylor, pastor of the Seamen's Bethel in Boston's North End and another Methodist, served as models for Father Mapple. Before his own whaling voyage, Melville heard Mudge preach at the Seamen's Bethel. Mudge was a contributor to Sailor's Magazine, which in December 1840 printed a series of sermons on Jonah. Father Taylor was a well-known preacher whose admirers included Emerson and Whitman. Both Taylor and Mapple fused Biblical imagery and colloquial language to deliver "anecdotal sermons to rough sailor congregations while perched theatrically on an elevated pulpit decorated with ship gear and backed by a wall painting of a seascape." The rope ladder is Melville's own amplification.

Models for the sermon
As David S. Reynolds explains, Melville was keenly aware of the popular literature and oratory of his time. Father Mapple's sermon is inspired by the more imaginative style of sermon that was becoming very popular in the United States. In addition, Reynolds argues, that Father Mapple would choose Jonah for a topic is in keeping with a 19th-century tradition of retellings of the biblical account in sermon form; Reynolds cites examples from as early as 1829. Such sermons employed nautical metaphors and colloquialisms, "producing a mixture of the imaginative and the sacred that directly anticipated Father Mapple's salty sermon".

Father Mapple's sermon
In chapters 7-9, Ishmael, a sailor about to sail for Nantucket where he will embark on a whaling voyage with Captain Ahab on the Pequod, goes to the Whaleman's Chapel in New Bedford. Father Mapple appears and climbs a rope ladder to his pulpit, which is the form of a ship's prow: "Its panelled front was in the likeness of a ship’s bluff bows, and the Holy Bible rested on a projecting piece of scroll work, fashioned after a ship's fiddle-headed beak."

Father Mapple addresses the parishioners as "Shipmates"  and leads them in a whaling hymn:

The ribs and terrors in the whale
Arched over me a dismal gloom,
While all God's sun-lit waves rolled by,
And lift me deepening down to doom.
...

In black distress, I called my God,
When I could scarce believe him mine,
He bowed his ear to my complaints-
No more the whale did me confine.

With speed he flew to my relief,
As on a radiant dolphin borne;
Awful, yet bright, as lightning shone
The face of my Deliverer God.
...

Mapple then takes as his text "And God had prepared a great fish to swallow up Jonah." The lesson, he says, is a "two-stranded lesson; a lesson to us all as sinful men, and a lesson to me as a pilot of the living God."

Jonah, Mapple begins, refuses God's commandment to go to the city of Nineveh and prophesy against rampant sin but instead tries to flee by taking passage on a ship. The sailors know from merely looking at him that Jonah is some sort of fugitive:

But the Lord raises a great storm, and after Jonah confesses to the sailors that his disobedience is the cause, Jonah is "taken up as an anchor and dropped into the sea." Instantly an "oily calmness floats out from the east, and the sea is still."  Yet the storm follows Jonah, and he drops "seething into the yawning jaws awaiting him". Jonah prays unto the Lord:

Mapple returns to the "two-stranded lesson":

Style 
Father Mapple speaks the language of Biblical prophets, scholar Nathalia Wright observes. In addition to the twelve quotations from the book of Jonah which appear in the first part of his sermon, he uses Biblical idioms such as "cast him forth", and "spake unto the fish." The interjection of "woe" in the penultimate paragraph derives from the prophets Jeremiah, Isaiah, and Ezekiel. The paragraph with "woes" is followed by a paragraph with "delights": the structure of the two paragraphs is parallel, though the content is antithetical. Besides the structure, the phraseology also echoes the prophets.

The psalm

 An example of Melville's appropriation and development of religious material for his own thematic purposes is the hymn in Father Mapple's sermon, which draws upon Psalm 18 in the version of The Psalms and Hymns... of the Reformed Protestant Dutch Church in North America (compare quoteboxes). Melville's changes and revisions transform the generalized theme of the Psalm into something that bears specific correspondence to the story of Jonah. While some of the changes are purely stylistic improvements, the whole exercise demonstrates the author's "ability to keep within the framework of his source while substituting particularized relevant material." While adhering to the meter and rhyme scheme of the original, the second stanza (the hymn's first stanza), is almost completely rewritten to reflect Jonah's situation as stated in the King James Version of the Book of Jonah, especially 2:3: "For thou hadst cast me into the deep, in the midst of the seas; and the floods compassed me about: all thy billows and thy waves passed over me." Unpredictable is the rejection of the word "flood," which appears in the Jonah story as well as in the Psalm. Three stanzas from the Psalm are omitted, probably because their subject matter is not apt for the Jonah story.

Thematic significance in the novel
Father Mapple's sermon addresses questions that fascinated Melville and tensions that run through the rest of the novel, since Father Mapple believes, as does Ahab, that truth is clear to see, and that human beings must pursue it in spite of all obstacles; Ishmael on the other hand finds that truth has many forms and is difficult to see or understand. Reynolds notes that Father Mapple, who changes the common metaphor of God as a ship's pilot and makes himself "the pilot of the living God", confirms "man's capacities as a truth seeker".

John Bryant argues that this sermon of Jonah's duty to deliver God's "appalling message" of destruction to the people of Nineveh parallels Melville's duty to "confront his own readers with the blasphemy yet logic of Ahab's anger and defiance". Nathalia Wright emphasizes Melville's general use of Biblical rhetoric and tone, and that his "prophetic strain" is most distinct in Father Mapple's sermon. Melville has Mapple use "the most familiar linguistic device of the Hebrew prophets", such as the repeated ejaculation "Woefullness of time", "outer darkness", "the blackness of darkness", and "the quick and the dead".

In adaptations
John Ince plays the part in the 1930 film, in which Father Mapple also has a daughter (played by Joan Bennett) with whom Ahab (John Barrymore) falls in love. 
Father Mapple was played by Orson Welles in the 1956 film.
Gregory Peck, who played Ahab in the 1956 film, won a Golden Globe as Father Mapple in the 1998 television series.
In the 2011 television series Donald Sutherland plays Father Mapple.

Notes

References

Bibliography
 Battenfeld, David H. (1955). "The Source for the Hymn in Moby-Dick." American Literature 27, November 1955, 393-6.

 Herman Melville, Moby-Dick, or The Whale (London, New York 1851).

External links
 Chapter 9 – Versions of Moby-Dick, Moby-Dick (American 1851) Melville Electronic Library, Hofstra University.
 Orson Welles Delivers Father Mapple's Sermon

Moby-Dick
Characters in American novels of the 19th century
Literary characters introduced in 1851
Fictional religious workers
Male characters in literature